Senator Breen may refer to:

Cathy Breen (born 1965), Maine State Senate
Fred Sylvester Breen (1869–1932), Arizona State Senate